Colchicum macrophyllum has large, funnel-shaped flowers in the fall with much tessellation throughout the bloom. The colour is rosy-purple and white.  The leaves that it produces in the spring are large, up to 16" (40 cm) long, among the largest of all colchicum species.

This plant is native to the area around the Aegean Sea (Turkey and Greece including Crete).

References

External links
Images (Crete)

macrophyllum
Flora of Turkey
Garden plants
Plants described in 1951
Flora of Crete
Flora of Greece